Darius Mead (January 27, 1798 – 1859) was an American politician who served one term in the Michigan House of Representatives.

Biography 

Darius Mead was born in Lanesborough, Massachusetts, on January 27, 1798, the son of Stephen and Druzilla Mead. He settled in Michigan in 1833.

Mead was elected as a Democrat to the Michigan House of Representatives as a representative from Lenawee County in 1835, where he also served as a justice and associate county judge. In 1836, he was named a commissioner of the River Raisin and Lake Erie Railroad Company.

He died in Blissfield, Michigan, in 1859.

Family 

Mead married Minerva B. Gardner. They had four children: John, Minerva, Helen M., and Daniel.

Notes

References 
 
 
 
 
 
 

1798 births
1859 deaths
Democratic Party members of the Michigan House of Representatives
People from Berkshire County, Massachusetts
19th-century American politicians
19th-century American judges